Star South American Championship are annual South American Championship sailing regattas in the Star class organised by the International Star Class Yacht Racing Association.

Editions

Medalists

References

Star (keelboat) competitions
Central and South American championships in sailing